The deputy prime minister of the United Kingdom is a minister of the Crown and a member of the British Cabinet. The office is not always in use, and prime ministers may use other offices, such as First Secretary of State, to indicate the seniority.

The office is currently held by Dominic Raab who has served since October 2022 under Rishi Sunak, having previously served as deputy under Boris Johnson.

Constitutional position
The office of deputy prime minister carries no salary and its holder has no right to automatic succession.

One classical argument made against appointing a minister to the office is that it might restrict the monarch's royal prerogative to choose a Prime Minister. However, Rodney Brazier has more recently written that there is a strong constitutional case for every Prime Minister to appoint a Deputy Prime Minister, to ensure an effective temporary transfer of power in most circumstances. Similarly, Vernon Bogdanor has said that that argument holds little weight in the modern context, since the monarch no longer has any real discretion, and that, even in the past, a person acting as deputy prime minister had no real advantage to being appointed Prime Minister by the monarch (though this might be different within political parties in relation to their respective leaderships). Like Brazier, he also says that there is a good constitutional case for recognising the office; for in the case of the death or incapacity of the incumbent prime minister.

Brazier has written that there are three reasons why a deputy prime minister has been appointed: to set out the line of succession to the premiership preferred by the prime minister, to promote the efficient discharge of government business and (in the case of Labour governments) to accord recognition to the status of the deputy leader of the Labour party.

When the office has been in use in the past, the deputy prime minister has deputised for the prime minister at Prime Minister's Questions.

History
Before World War II, a minister was occasionally invited to act as deputy prime minister when the prime minister was ill or abroad, but no one was styled as such when the prime minister was in the country and physically able to run the government.

This changed in 1942 when Clement Attlee was appointed deputy prime minister, though such a designation was seen as an exceptional result of a coalition and the war, and it has been said that Attlee's 1942 appointment was not formally approved by the King or, similarly, a matter of form rather than fact. The designation was because Prime Minister Winston Churchill wanted to demonstrate the importance of the Labour party in the coalition, not for any reasons relating to succession; he actually left written advice that the King should send for Anthony Eden if he were to die, not Attlee. Junior party leaders Lord Curzon of Kedleston, Bonar Law and Nick Clegg were similarly given offices in coalitions.

After this, fearing a possible curtailment of the monarch's prerogative to choose a prime minister, no one was formally styled deputy prime minister (though there was often a senior minister generally regarded as such) until Michael Heseltine in 1995. John Prescott in 1997, Clegg in 2010, Raab in 2021 and Coffey in 2022 were later appointed deputy prime minister. Raab was later reappointed in 2022, following the end of the Truss ministry, becoming the first non-consecutive holder of the office.

Office and residence
There is no set of offices permanently ready to house the deputy prime minister. Deputy Prime Minister Nick Clegg maintained an office at the Cabinet Office headquarters, 70 Whitehall, which is linked to 10 Downing Street. Clegg's predecessor, Prescott, maintained his main office at 26 Whitehall.

The prime minister may also give them the use of a grace and favour country house. While in office, Nick Clegg resided at his private residence in Putney and he shared Chevening House with First Secretary William Hague as a weekend residence. Clegg's predecessor, John Prescott, used Dorneywood.

Succession
Nobody has the right of automatic succession to the prime ministership. However, it is generally considered that in the event of the death of the prime minister, it would be appropriate to appoint an interim prime minister, though there is some debate as to how to decide who this should be.

According to Brazier, there are no procedures within government to cope with the sudden death of the prime minister. There is also no such title as acting prime minister of the United Kingdom. Despite refusing "...to discuss a hypothetical situation" with BBC News in 2011, the Cabinet Office is reported to have said in 2006:

Additionally, when the prime minister is travelling, it is standard practice for a senior duty minister to be appointed who can attend to urgent business and meetings if required, though the prime minister remains in charge and updated throughout.

On 6 April 2020, when Prime Minister Boris Johnson was admitted into ICU, he asked First Secretary of State Dominic Raab "to deputise for him where necessary".

List of deputy prime ministers 
In addition to the many unofficial deputies (see below), some people have been formally appointed deputy prime minister. Ministers are appointed by the monarch, on the advice of the prime minister. Five people can be described as definitely having been appointed deputy prime minister in such a manner.

Timeline

Unofficial deputies 
The prime minister's second-in-command has variably served as deputy prime minister, first secretary and de facto deputy and at other times prime ministers have chosen not to select a permanent deputy at all, preferring ad hoc arrangements. It has also been suggested that the office of Lord President of the Council (which comes with leading precedence) has been intermittently used for deputies in the past.

Lists 

Picking out definitive deputies to the prime minister has been described as a highly problematic task.

Bogdanor, in his 1995 publication The Monarchy and the Constitution, said that the following people had acted as deputy prime ministers (by this he meant they had chaired the Cabinet in the absence of the prime minister and chaired a number of key Cabinet Committees):

In an academic article first published in 2015, Jonathan Kirkup and Stephen Thornton used five criteria to identify deputies: gazetted or styled in Hansard as deputy prime minister; 'officially' designated deputy prime minister by the prime minister; widely recognised by their colleagues as deputy prime minister; second in the ministerial ranking; and chaired the Cabinet or took Prime Minister's Questions in the prime minister's absence. They said that the following people have the best claim to the position of deputy to the prime minister:

They also said that the following three people would have a reasonable claim:

Brazier has listed the following ministers as unambiguously deputy to or de facto deputies of the prime minister:

Lord Norton of Louth has listed the following people as serving as deputy prime minister, but not being formally styled as such:

See also 
 First Secretary of State
 Deputy Leader of the Conservative Party (UK)
 Deputy Leader of the Labour Party (UK)

Notes

References 
 
 
 
 
 
 
 
 
 

Ministerial offices in the United Kingdom
 
Cabinet Office (United Kingdom)
1942 establishments in the United Kingdom